Eugénie Grandet (1994) is a French film directed  by Jean-Daniel Verhaeghe. The film starred Jean Carmet in his last role.

Plot summary
Monsieur Grandet (Carmet) was a very rich but very stingy man. His wife (Dominique Labourier) and his daughter Eugénie (Alexandra London) live a quiet, joyless existence.

The local families Des Grassins and Cruchot want to marry their sons to Eugénie. On her 23rd birthday, Lucienne des Grassins (Claude Jade) triumphed about the success of her son Adolphe (Olivier Delor) at the heiress, arrives Charles (Jean-Claude Adelin), Eugenie's cousin to visit at his uncle; he has no idea that his father is dead by suicide after his bankruptcy. Eugénie and her cousin fall in love, and the unworldly girl felt for the first time the wild joy of passion. But her father, who has no idea, does not intend to keep the useless eaters in the house, and sends Charles without a sou to India. First, however, Eugénie lends him her coin collection, which her father had given her for her birthday.

Crew 
 Director : Jean-Daniel Verhaeghe
 Writer : Pierre Moustiers, based on the novel by Honoré de Balzac
 Composer: Michel Portal

Cast 
 Alexandra London : Eugénie Grandet
 Jean Carmet : Félix Grandet
 Jean-Claude Adelin : Charles Grandet
 Dominique Labourier : Madame Grandet
 Claude Jade : Lucienne des Grassins
 Pierre Vernier : Monsieur des Grassins
 Bernard Haller : Abbé Cruchot
 Sacha Briquet : Maître Cruchot
 Olivier Delor : Adolphe des Grassins
 Rose Thierry : Nanon
 Pascal Elso : Bonfons Cruchot

Prize 
7 d'or 1995
 7 d'or for Best Actor Jean Carmet
 7 d'or for Best Composer Michel Portal

References 

Films based on Eugénie Grandet
1994 films
French drama films
1990s French-language films